Mark Brian Logan (born 17 April 1960) is a former cricketer who played first-class cricket in South Africa from 1981 to 1993.

A batsman who usually opened the innings, he made his highest first-class score of 172 when he captained the South African Defence Force team in 1984–85. His highest score for Natal, for whom he played most of his cricket, was 150 against Transvaal in 1991–92.

References

External links
 
 

1960 births
Living people
South African cricketers
KwaZulu-Natal cricketers
Cricketers from Durban
South African people of British descent